Oakland Unified School District is a public education school district that operates a total of 80 elementary schools (TK–5), middle schools (6–8), and high schools (9–12). There are also 28 district-authorized charter schools in Oakland, California, United States, serving a total of 48,704 students across both district-run and district-authorized charter schools (as of census day in 2020–21, with 35,489 of those students served by district-run schools).

Located in California's most diverse city, OUSD serves a diverse population of students. Nearly half of the students in district and charter schools speak a non-English language at home. For the school year 2016–17, 31 percent of OUSD students were English-language learners. OUSD also serves a large population of newcomer students. Seventy-three percent of students receive free or reduced-price meals.

OUSD was among the first school districts in the country to implement restorative justice practices to limit or eliminate suspensions. During the 2015 school year, 96.1 percent of students were not suspended.

Started in 2010, OUSD's African American Male Achievement Initiative enrolls more than 400 students. Students in the program have experienced success, including higher GPAs, higher graduation rates (up over 10 percent), and lower suspension rates (with a decrease of ⅓ for students enrolled in the program). In 2016, OUSD launched an African American Girls and Young Women Achievement Program.

In 2015 and 2016, OUSD forged partnerships with and secured grants from a number of technology companies, including Salesforce, Intel, Code.org, and Google, and set a goal to make computer science a graduation requirement for the freshman class that begins school in 2017.

History
The first school in Oakland opened in the 1850s and was located in a rented room in the back of a fandango at Second and Washington Streets. On July 12, 1853, the city held a parade to the first official school building. The schoolhouse was at the corner of Fifth and Clay and cost $1,000 to construct. The first school house had 16 students and was taught by a woman named Hannah Jayne. She was the only teacher in Oakland until 1855. Franklin Warner was hired soon after as Oakland's first principal. Frederick M. Campbell was hired as Oakland's first Superintendent. Reading, writing and arithmetic were stressed, as well as American history. Paper and books were scarce, so a lot of learning was done out loud.

In 1860, there were about 400 students in one-room schoolhouses taught by one teacher, and another school building at Fifth and Broadway taught older students. The first public high school opened in 1869 with 29 students. By the end of the 1870s, there was a public high school and nine public grade schools. In the 1880s, the first kindergarten and the first night school in Oakland opened.

A 1909 Chamber of Commerce guide to the city includes this description of Oakland public schools: "Oakland's chief pride is its public school system and the fact that her schools rank among the highest in the United States. No more modern school buildings can be found in any city in the United States than in Oakland. There are twenty-two public school buildings, and according to the figures of the City Assessor (which, upon municipal property are naturally low) the school land valuations amount to One Million, Ninety-three Thousand, Two Hundred Seventy-five Dollars … Connected with the High School is a completely equipped observatory, in which the study of astronomy is made effective and interesting with the aid of the most modern instruments."

A City of Oakland Chamber of Commerce brochure from 1915, which includes a photo of Oakland Technical High School, states: "The pride of Oakland is its schools. This, the Technical High School, with forges, machine shops, a great auditorium seating 1600 people, chemical laboratories and many other education features which prepare young men and women for an active and useful life, is one of the finest structures of its kind in the United States."

A 1915 Board of Education guide to Oakland schools included 46 schools, many of which are still open today. They include Allendale, Claremont, Cleveland, Dewey, Elmhurst, Emerson, Franklin, Frick, Fruitvale, Lincoln, Manzanita, McClymonds, Melrose, Peralta, Piedmont, Prescott, Sequoia, Santa Fe, Fremont High, Oakland High, and Oakland Tech. High school departments included English, History, Foreign Languages, Mathematics, Science, Commercial, Home Economics, Physical Training, Shop and Drawing.

Oakland's first teachers' union, the Oakland Federation of Teachers, was first organized on May 3, 1943, as the Alameda County Federation of Teachers, Local 771 of the American Federation of Teachers (AFT) to "improve the educational facilities for the children of the nation and to improve the working conditions of the teachers in the public schools."

Oakland's first African American Superintendent was Dr. Marcus Foster, who was also the first black man to head a major U.S. school district. Born in Athens, Georgia, Dr. Foster arrived in Oakland in 1970, “already a celebrated and proven educator”. Dr. Foster viewed the three Rs and critical thinking as the building blocks of education. He also emphasized the need for art programs, team sports, and school activities that reflected the life circumstances of the students. In the short time he was in Oakland, Dr. Foster created a climate that gave life to a number of firsts: the Arts Magnet School, Far West School, Street Academy, Montera Film Festival (now the National Educational Film Festival), and the Oakland Education Institute (now the Marcus Foster Education Institute). Dr. Foster was murdered by the Symbionese Liberation Army in November, 1973.

In 2003, OUSD Superintendent Dennis K. Chaconas was fired and Governor Gray Davis approved a $100 million emergency loan, the biggest school bailout in California history. Chaconas was replaced by a state-appointed administrator, Randolph E. Ward. Ward resigned in July 2006 after being appointed superintendent of the San Diego public school system. Kimberly Statham was named Ward's permanent replacement, but she resigned suddenly on September 17, 2007, ostensibly under pressure from state officials. OUSD Chief of Staff Vincent Matthews was named interim superintendent.

In 2008, the state turned control over OUSD back to the city. The local school board hired an interim superintendent, Roberta Mayor, in July 2008 while the school board undertook a year-long search for a permanent leader. Anthony "Tony" Smith was hired in July 2009 as the district's permanent superintendent. Smith resigned suddenly in April 2013 after four years leading the district, citing family health issues. School board member Dr. Gary Yee was named the acting superintendent. In September 2014, Antwan Wilson became OUSD's fourth superintendent in six years. After just two years at the helm, Wilson resigned in November 2016 to become chancellor of the District of Columbia Public Schools. Devin Dillon, OUSD's deputy superintendent of Academic Social Emotional Learning, was named acting superintendent, effective February 1, 2017. The school board selected Kyla Johnson-Trammell to replace Wilson as superintendent in July 2017. Johnson-Trammell grew up in East Oakland, attended Oakland public elementary and middle schools, and had served the district as a teacher, principal, and administrator.

Grand Jury reports
Oakland Unified School District has experienced ongoing financial difficulties in recent years. A 2018 Alameda County Civil Grand Jury report noted that the District had been "in financial peril" for the prior 15 years, with an average $20 million to $30 million in debt each year, due to budgetary errors and out-of-control spending. Enrollment had dropped from 54,000 to 37,000 students, resulting in decreased state funding, but the district had opened more schools (Rudsdale Newcomer School, which serves immigrants, and the School of Language, a bilingual middle school), rather than closing them in response to declining enrollment, the report found. The report also criticized "system-wide failures" including "no accountability, lack of trust, and high teacher and administration turnover."

Another Alameda County Civil Grand Jury Report published a year later that financial instability was due to "the district’s poor business practices and broken culture," rather than just outside pressures like declining enrollment. The report found that although the District ranked sixth in per-pupil state funding out of 37 Bay Area school districts, it had far above average spending on non-teaching costs and consultants, and lower than average spending on teachers and special education. Spending for supervisor and administrator salaries was found to be more than six times the statewide average. Under Superintendent Antwan Wilson, the report said, millions of dollars were wasted as capital projects were halted in the planning stages, and $172 million was spent on new construction projects, leaving the district's finances "in shambles." The Board of Education responded that the new Blueprint for Quality Schools, the Citywide Plan, and the Plan for Fiscal Vitality, released between the Grand Jury's investigation and the publication of its report, had already addressed some of the Grand Jury's recommendations. The Board of Education also disagreed or partially disagreed with many of the report's findings.

2019 strike
Oakland Unified teachers went on strike for seven days, beginning on February 21, 2019, for fully funded public education, higher wages, and smaller class size. The strikes were part of the RedforEd campaign and were organized by the Oakland Education Association (OEA)--a union for teachers—and East Bay Democratic Socialists of America (EBDSA). Oakland Unified School District is under populated with a total of 87 public schools, so they have a plan to close some public, unionized (and predominantly low-income) schools over the next few years in order to save money. $57 million meant for public-sector schools is funneled to the private-sector charter schools a year.

Leading up to the strike there was a meeting with the Oakland Unified School District Board of Education in which the community of Roots Academy, a school facing closure, testified a plea to keep their school open. Teachers gathered at the #RedforEd rally January 12, demonstrating that they are strike-ready. In show of solidarity, ten non-union charter schools “engaged in a wildcat sympathy strike”. Rallies continued as teachers from all around the Bay Area took a sick day on January 18, 2019 and gathered at Oakland Technical High School to march to city hall in the name of public education. In an interview at the “sickout”, an Oakland teacher said “We have not had a contract for several years….The district is currently offering a 5% raise amounting to $70 extra which is not enough to keep up with the rising cost of housing in Oakland.” 1 in 5 teachers leave Oakland Unified School District because they cannot afford to teach in the city they live in. When asked if they had enough resources to succeed, three Oakland Tech students replied “No, we don’t even have paper in some of the class rooms. Some kids do not have textbooks and they have to do their work at home, where they may not have internet. Our classes are overfilled. Sometimes students will try to print their work in the library but there will be no paper if there is no librarian. We did not have a librarian this whole school year until last week.”. Bread for Ed raised more than $175,000 to feed children and families out of school, because “73 percent of [Oakland] students depend on free or reduced lunch from their school”.

The teachers struck for seven days. “97% of students were out of school, and tens of thousands were on the picket lines”, according to Oakland Education Association. On February 28, 2019, OUSD “reached a tentative agreement” with OEA. On Sunday, March 3, Oakland Education Association teachers voted to authorize a new contract to implement an 11 percent increase in teachers’ salary for the next four years, plus a 3 percent bonus to account for losses during the strike. The agreement also demands to decrease class size, hold off school closures for five months, and have the district vote on whether or not to push the state for a moratorium of charter schools. Not all of the demands were granted, but the Oakland teacher strikes empowered the community to face the billionaire-backed operation to privatize education.

Bond measures

In 2012, voters passed Measure J, a $475 million school facilities bond. The 2018–19 Alameda County Civil Grand Jury report found that mismanagement led to delays in the 21 projects that were to be funded with Measure J, and in 2018, nine of those projects were paused due to budget overruns and the district running out of funds. As of the publication of the Grand Jury report, $12.5 million of bond money had been spent over the prior four years on rented office space for central offices at 1000 Broadway following a flood in the administration building in 2014, despite questions about the legality of this practice.

In November 2020, Measure Y will ask voters whether to issue $735 million in additional bonds. If passed, the bonds will fund more than 20 projects, including upgrading and expanding seven schools, safety improvements, and converting a closed school to a new alternative education and administrative building, but are only one fifth of the district's calculated financial need for construction projects.

Schools

The district-run schools includes 59 elementary schools, 13 middle schools, 19 high schools, with 9 alternative education schools and programs, 4 adult programs and early childhood education centers at most of the elementary schools. There are 38,000 K-12 students in district schools and more than 5,000 employees.

Elementary and middle schools

Montclair Elementary School
In 2015, Montclair Elementary was recognized with the nation's highest honor for a K-12 school, the Blue Ribbon award, which recognizes "exemplary teaching and learning". Only 10 schools in the Bay Area, public or private, received the award that year.

Nearly half the students (47 percent) who attend Montclair come from outside the neighborhood. The East Bay Times reported, "One of the school's secrets to success is what (Principal Nancy) Bloom calls the morning intervention acceleration model. Used in the kindergarten, first and second grades, children meet once a week in groups with no more than four or five students and get targeted instruction that meets their individual needs. On the other days, the students are outside doing physical education."

The school serves an increasing number of English language learner students and students who receive free and reduced-price meals.

In 2016, Collaborative for High Performance Schools praised Montclair Elementary's energy efficient design.

Coliseum College Preparatory Academy
In 2015, Coliseum College Prep Academy (CCPA), located on the Havenscourt Campus in East Oakland, achieved a 91 percent graduation rate. The school serves about 450 students and a large percentage are English language learners (170 students in 2014-15). CCPA's ethnic breakdown for the 2013–14 school year consisted of 42.7% Hispanic or Latino students, 28% Black or African American students, 13.2% Asian students, 9.8% White students, 2.6% students of two or more races, and 1.1% Native Hawaiian or Pacific Islander.

Notable alumni

Notable Oakland public school graduates include:
 David Carradine - actor
 Del the Funky Homosapien - musician
 Ronald V. Dellums - Congressman and Mayor of Oakland
 Clint Eastwood - actor and director
Scott Feldman — Major League Baseball pitcher
 Ben Fong-Torres - music writer
 Chick Gandil - baseball player; member of the infamous 1919 "Black Sox"
 Larry Graham - musician
 Tom Hanks - actor
 Rickey Henderson - Baseball Hall of Famer
 Marsha Hunt - musician
 Brian Johnson - baseball player
 Kehlani - musician
 Damian Lillard - NBA star
 Jack London - author
 Marshawn Lynch - football player
 MC Hammer - musician
 Edwin Meese - Attorney General
 Joe Morgan - Baseball Hall of Famer
 Julia Morgan - architect
 Lloyd Moseby - baseball player
 Huey P. Newton - activist
 Sten Odenwald - astronomer
 Gary Payton - Basketball Hall of Famer
 Marcus Peters - football player
 Bip Roberts - baseball player
 Frank Robinson - Baseball Hall of Famer
 Bill Russell - Basketball Hall of Famer
 Sheila E. - musician
 Dave Stewart - baseball player 
 Too $hort - musician
 Emory Johnson - actor and director

References

External links

 Oakland Unified School District
 List of schools and test scores

 
Politics of Oakland, California